Isaac Kragten is a Canadian actor. He is best known for his role as Agent Otis in Odd Squad for which he won the Daytime Emmy Award for Outstanding Performer in a Children's, Pre-School Children's or Family Viewing Program at the 44th Daytime Emmy Awards. He also portrayed Josh in Breakthrough.

Early life 
Isaac Kragten was born in Caledonia, Ontario. He has an older brother and a younger sister, Hattie Kragten, an actress who has appeared in Snoopy in Space and Abby Hatcher among other roles.

Career 
Kragten was found through dance competitions when a judge of the competition offered to give Kragten an agent. He began his acting career in 2015 when he appeared in an episode of Rookie Blue. Kragten later appeared as Agent Otis in the PBS Kids/TVOKids educational, comedy series Odd Squad. He reprised his role as Agent Otis in Odd Squad: The Movie, marking his first theatrical appearance.

Filmography

Films

Television

Awards and nominations

References

External links 

Living people
2002 births
21st-century Canadian male actors
Male actors from Ontario
Canadian male child actors
Canadian male film actors
Canadian male television actors
Daytime Emmy Award winners